"Don't Save Me" is the first single by Norwegian pop music singer and M2M member Marit Larsen released from her debut album Under the Surface. The single was released on 2 February 2006 in Norway. After debuting at No. 3, the single climbed to No. 1 and stayed at the top for five consecutive weeks.

Track listing
Norwegian CD Single
"Don't Save Me" Album Version – 3:48
"Don't Save Me" Enhanced Music Video

Charts

References

2006 singles
Marit Larsen songs
Number-one singles in Norway
2005 songs
EMI Records singles
Songs written by Peter Zizzo
Songs written by Marit Larsen